Courchavon railway station is a railway station in the municipality of Courchavon, in the Swiss canton of Jura. It is an intermediate stop on the standard gauge Delémont–Delle line of Swiss Federal Railways.

Services
The following services stop at Courchavon:

 RegioExpress: hourly service between Meroux or Delle and Biel/Bienne.

References

External links 
 
 

Railway stations in the canton of Jura
Swiss Federal Railways stations